WGCR (720 AM) is a radio station broadcasting a Christian radio format. Located in Pisgah Forest, North Carolina, the station serves the Asheville area, but can be heard in upstate South Carolina and extreme northeast Georgia as well.  The station is owned and operated by Anchor Baptist Broadcasting Inc.

Because it shares the same frequency as clear channel station WGN in Chicago, WGCR broadcasts sunrise to sunset only.  The FM translator on 94.9 MHz is allowed by the FCC to broadcast unlimited hours.

References

External links

GCR
GCR
Radio stations established in 1984
1984 establishments in North Carolina